Colonel Constantin Denis Bourbaki (1787 – 8 February 1827) was a Greek officer educated in France, and serving in the French military. He fought in the last phases of the Napoleonic Wars, and after 1825, joined the Greek War of Independence. He was killed in 1827 following his defeat at the Battle of Kamatero. He is the father of French General Charles Denis Bourbaki.

Biography

Early life
Bourbaki was born on the island of Kefalonia in 1787. He was the son of Konstantinos-Sotirios Vourvachis, a Greek of Cretan extraction who was forced to relocate to Kephalonia. Thanks to his father's influence with Napoleon, he was able to join the military academy at Fontainebleau (which was later relocated to St Cyr). He graduated from the academy in 1804.

Career under Napoleon and retirement
Following his graduation, he took part in several conflicts of the Napoleonic Wars, and was appointed aide-de-camp to Joseph Bonaparte, who had been appointed King of Spain by Napoleon. However, following the Emperor's exile to Elba, he resigned his commission in the military. After Napoleon's return to France, he resumed active duty with the rank of colonel, but he resigned again after the defeat at Waterloo and the Bourbon Restoration in 1815. In the following years, he left France for Spain due to a duel, but was expelled soon afterwards for his anti-monarchist views. He retired to the town of Pau, in the French Pyrenees.

Service during the Greek War of Independence
Following the outbreak of the Greek Revolution in 1821, Bourbaki initiated contact with the philhellenic groups of Paris. In 1825, he was involved in an attempt to secure the Greek throne for Louis, Duke of Nemours, second son of Louis-Philippe, Duke of Orléans. In 1826, he was sent to Greece as the head of a number of French volunteers, and intended to place himself under the command of Georgios Karaiskakis.

He received a negative reaction from the anglophile government in Nafplion. Nevertheless, he recruited a body of 80 men at his own expense, and joined Greek chieftains Vasos Mavrovouniotis and Panagiotis Notaras. The three bodies advanced in unison into Attica in January, 1827, with the intent of relieving the Greek garrison besieged at the Acropolis of Athens.

The force, numbering about 500 men in total, and under the command of Bourbaki, advanced to Eleusis in February, and faced the Ottomans at the Battle of Kamatero on 8 February (27 January in the Julian calendar). Despite opposite opinions by the Greek chieftains, Bourbaki insisted on facing the Ottomans in an organised formation. His force was defeated by the Ottoman cavalry, losing over 300 men. He was captured, and beheaded later the same day.

Memorials
Vourvachis street in Kamatero is named after Bourbaki in honour of his heroic death on the town's premises. Moreover, the municipality has occasionally held games in his honour, called the Vourvachia, with varying success.

See also
Nicolas Bourbaki

References

Whitcombe, T. D. Campaign of the Falieri and Piraeus in 1827 (edited by C. W. J. Eliot) Town House Press Inc., Pittsboro, North Carolina, 1992.
Τρικούπης, Σ. Ιστορία της Ελληνικής Επαναστάσεως, τόμος Δ’, σ. 99.

1787 births
1827 deaths
People from Cephalonia
Eastern Orthodox Christians from Greece
Greek colonels
French military personnel of the Napoleonic Wars
Greek people of the Greek War of Independence
Greek emigrants to France
French colonels
Greek military personnel killed in action
École Spéciale Militaire de Saint-Cyr alumni